Bootettix is a genus of slant-faced grasshoppers in the family Acrididae. There are at least two described species in Bootettix.

Species
These two species belong to the genus Bootettix:
 Bootettix argentatus Bruner, 1890 (creosote bush grasshopper)
 Bootettix joerni Otte, 1979

References

Further reading

 
 
 

Gomphocerinae
Articles created by Qbugbot
Acrididae genera